Norway was represented by duo Dollie de Luxe, with the song "Lenge leve livet" at the 1984 Eurovision Song Contest, which took place on 5 May in Luxembourg City. "Lenge leve livet" was chosen as the Norwegian entry at the Melodi Grand Prix on 7 April.

Before Eurovision

Melodi Grand Prix 1984 
The Melodi Grand Prix 1984 was organised by broadcaster NRK and was held at the Château Neuf in Oslo, hosted by Sissel Keyn Lodding. Ten songs took part in the final, with the winner chosen by voting from five juries separated by age. It was one of the closest MGPs, with only 3 points separating the top four songs.

At Eurovision 
On the night of the final de Luxe performed 5th in the running order, following Spain and preceding the United Kingdom. At the close of voting "Lenge leve livet" had picked up 29 points (the highest an 8 from Sweden), placing Norway 17th of the 19 entries. The Norwegian jury awarded its 12 points to Denmark.

Voting

References

External links 
Full national final on nrk.no

1984
Countries in the Eurovision Song Contest 1984
1984
Eurovision
Eurovision